Rongcheng is a county in central Hebei province, China. It is under the jurisdiction of Baoding prefecture-level city.

Administrative divisions
Rongcheng County administers 5 towns and 3 townships:

Towns:
Rongcheng, Xiaoli, Nanzhang, Dahe, Liangmatai

Townships:
Bayu Township, Jiaguang Township, Pingwang Township

Climate

References

External links

Geography of Baoding
County-level divisions of Hebei